Jimmy Beaulieu (born 1974) is a Canadian cartoonist. He has worked as an editor for the Mecanique Generale label (of publisher 400 Coups), lecturer, dialogist, organizer and critic. Co-founder of the 'Mécanique Générale' collective of artists, with a mandate to help establish a place for Sequential Art in the cultural landscape. He moved to Montreal in 1998, when he started drawing comics.

References

External links 

 Official site
 Projet domiciliaire
 lambiek.net profile
 profile by Rupert Bottenberg

1974 births
Living people
Canadian comics artists
Canadian graphic novelists